A contract for future sale is a sales contract under which a farmer agrees to deliver products of specified quality and quantity to a buyer for a specified price within a prescribed time frame.  Contract sales are a growing practice, recently accounting for 86% of poultry, over 80% of tobacco, more than 50% of fruits, and 43% of milk.  The benefits to processors are greater uniformity and predictability resulting in lower costs of grading, processing, and packing.  The benefits to farmers are more stable income from a guaranteed market and price, and possibly access to a wider range of production inputs and advanced technology. Critics are concerned about lack of accessible price information, and manipulation of markets to the disadvantage of producers.

References 

United States Department of Agriculture